= John Huston bibliography =

A list of books and essays about John Huston:

- Brill, Lesley (13 October 1997). John Huston's Filmmaking. Cambridge University Press. ISBN 978-0-521-58670-2.
- Huston, John (1994). An Open Book. Perseus Books Group. ISBN 978-0-306-80573-8.
- Long, Robert Emmet (1 January 2001). John Huston: Interviews. Univ. Press of Mississippi. ISBN 978-1-57806-328-4.
- Luhr, William (1995). The Maltese Falcon: John Huston, Director. Rutgers University Press. ISBN 978-0-8135-2237-1.
- Meyers, Jeffrey (27 September 2011). John Huston: Courage and Art. Crown Publishing Group. ISBN 978-0-307-59069-5.
- Tracy, Tony; Flynn, Roddy (23 June 2010). John Huston: Essays on a Restless Director. McFarland. ISBN 978-0-7864-5993-3.
